Fyn or FYN may refer to:
 Fyn, or Funen, Denmark
Fyn (Folketing constituency)
 FYN, encoding the proto-oncogene tyrosine-protein kinase Fyn
 Freshwater, Yarmouth and Newport Railway, a defunct railway of England
 Fuyun Koktokay Airport, in Xinjiang, China
 Federal Yugoslav Navy, the navy of the Federal Republic of Yugoslavia